Angus McKenzie can refer to:

 Angus McKenzie (cricketer)
 Angus McKenzie (fencer)